José Alberto Vallejo (born 22 October 1942) is an Argentine athlete. He competed in the men's hammer throw at the 1972 Summer Olympics.

References

External links
 

1942 births
Living people
Athletes (track and field) at the 1972 Summer Olympics
Argentine male hammer throwers
Olympic athletes of Argentina
Athletes (track and field) at the 1967 Pan American Games
Athletes (track and field) at the 1971 Pan American Games
Athletes (track and field) at the 1975 Pan American Games
Athletes (track and field) at the 1979 Pan American Games
Pan American Games competitors for Argentina
Place of birth missing (living people)
South American Games gold medalists for Argentina
South American Games silver medalists for Argentina
South American Games medalists in athletics
Competitors at the 1978 Southern Cross Games